TVING is a South Korean online streaming service operated by TVING Corporation, a joint venture of CJ E&M (CJ Group), Naver and JTBC. It is a platform that streams dramas, entertainment shows, exclusive television films and specials.

History

TVING was launched on May 31, 2010, by CJ HelloVision. In January 2016, the service was transferred to CJ E&M. On September 17, 2019, CJ E&M and JTBC signed an MOU to establish a joint venture company to operate the service. On October 1, 2020, the joint venture company was launched as TVING Corporation and Yang Ji-eul became the first CEO of the entity. On April 29, 2021, TVING announced that it would no longer provide real-time TV channels for free with paid subscription needed in order to view the content moving forward. On June 30, 2021, it was announced that Naver has invested  billion into TVING Corporation, making Naver the second largest shareholders at 15% after CJ E&M.

During the TVING Connect online event, they were planned to launch the service in Japan & Taiwan by 2022. TVING has also currently on further discussion with Naver subsidiary, Line Corporation, for launching the platform in other Asian countries as well. TVING may also planned to launch on America & Europe in the near future.

In early December 2021, CJ ENM has partnered with Paramount (formerly ViacomCBS) to launch Paramount+ as content hub on TVING, which set to be launched on June 16, 2022. They also unveiled to co-produce K-drama from both CJ (including Studio Dragon and newly formed CJ ENM Studios) and Paramount. Their first co-produced K-drama was TVING original science fiction drama Yonder, which set to be premiered on Paramount+ outside Korea.

In July 2022, CJ ENM and telecom giant KT announced that KT own streaming platform  will be merging with TVING. Once both of the streaming platform merged, TVING will become Korea's largest streaming platform and will be competing with Netflix, Disney+, among others, such as SK Telecom's  and fast-growing Coupang Play. The merger has been approved by the Korean FTC in late October, which unlikely to increase the price of their subscriptions alongside to carried tvN dramas other than just themselves.

Original programming

Drama

Entertainment

Film

Special

Availability

See also
 List of streaming media services

Notes

References

External links
  

Internet television streaming services
2020 establishments in South Korea
Internet properties established in 2020
IOS software
Android (operating system) software
2020 software
Subscription video on demand services